In Dub – Live is a psychedelic dub album by English musician Hallucinogen, released on 13 May 2009. Most of tracks are rearrangement of his previous works. It was recorded live at Brixton Academy, London on 25 May 2007.

Track listing
"LSD"
"Spiritual Antiseptic"
"Cicada"
"Solstice"
"HiD"
"Dark Persuasion"
"Angelic Particles"
"Rent Boy"
"Gamma Goblins"

External links 
In Dub on Discogs

Hallucinogen (musician) albums
2009 live albums